Lualaba may refer to:

 Lualaba District, a district in the former Katanga Province in the Democratic Republic of the Congo
 Lualaba Province, a province of the DRC
 Lualaba River, the greatest headstream of the Congo River, DRC